Christ on the Cross may refer to one of four oil on canvas paintings by the Spanish Baroque artist Bartolomé Esteban Murillo:

References

Paintings by Bartolomé Esteban Murillo
Paintings depicting the Crucifixion of Jesus